Byun Hee-soo (11 June 1998 – between 28 February and 3 March 2021) was the first known transgender soldier in South Korea.

She had risen to the rank of staff sergeant and was a tank driver before being discharged from the army in January 2020 after she underwent gender reassignment surgery in Thailand in November 2019. She had fought for the right to continue serving in the army, but was denied and discharged. The army subsequently denied her request for reinstatement in July 2020.

Speaking about her decision to undergo surgery, she stated, "I thought I would finish serving in the army and then go through the transition surgery and then reenter the army as a female soldier. But my depression got too severe.", "I want to show everyone that I can also be one of the great soldiers who protect this country."

In March 2021, she was found dead in her home. Workers from Sangdanggu National Mental Health Center (where Byun received treatment) called for someone to check up on her as they hadn’t been able to reach her since 28 February. The fire department arrived at Ms Byun’s house on 3 March, and found her body at 5:49 pm KST. Her body had already started to decompose.
 
On 7 Oct, South Korean court ruled that the military discharge is unlawful and cancelled the discharge.

See also
 LGBT history in South Korea
 LGBT rights in South Korea
 Sexual orientation and gender identity in the South Korean military
 Transgender personnel in the South Korean military

References

1998 births
2021 deaths
People from Cheongju
South Korean transgender people
Transgender military personnel
Transgender women
Republic of Korea Army personnel
21st-century South Korean LGBT people